William Virgil Davis is an American poet.

He has published poems in Poetry, The Nation, The Hudson Review, The Georgia Review, The Hopkins Review, The Gettysburg Review, The New Criterion, The Sewanee Review, The Atlantic Monthly, Denver Quarterly, and Shenandoah, among others. He has also published several books of literary criticism, as well as critical essays in numerous periodicals. He is Professor of English and Writer-in-Residence at Baylor University.

Biography
William Virgil Davis was born in the United States of America in 1940, in Ohio. He studied at Ohio University. He has lived and taught in Austria, Denmark and Wales for extended periods of time.

Awards
 1979 Yale Series of Younger Poets Prize
 1984 Calliope Press Chapbook Prize
 2009 New Criterion Poetry Prize
 2010 Helen C. Smith Memorial Award for Poetry

Works
 BITTERROOT: INTERNATIONAL POETRY QUARTERLY TENTH ANNIVERSARY, Menke Katz (editor-in-chief), VOLUME X NUMBER 4 ISSUE 40, SUMMER 1972
 The Ohio Poem, Hudson Review, Spring 1982, Vol. 35 Issue 1, p69-70, 2p
 Artful Dodge, Issue 26/27 (1994)
 THE BRIDGE: A JOURNAL OF FICTION & POETRY VOLUME, Jack Zucker (editor), 6 NUMBER 2 FALL / WINTER 1997
 FOUR QUARTERS, John J. Keenan(editor), VOLUME 8, NUMBER 2, SECOND SERIES FALL, 1994
 A visit to Manafon, The New Criterion, April 1997
 Deserter; A Corpse in Gloves; Tracks, The Courtland Review, Issue Four, August 1998
 Courtyard looking toward Artemis from the west cloister, The New Criterion, December 2001
 SPECIAL ISSUE: POETRY TOUR GUIDE U.S. 62, Pudding 44, Summer 2002, 54 pages
 The Staying, Leaves, and The Singing,, The Gettsburg Review, Autumn Spring 2002
 The Other, AGNI 59, 2004
 A Vision in Late Afternoon, The Gettsburg Review, Autumn 2005
 Morning; Seasons; Sentinel, Webber The Contemporary West, Spring/Summer 2006, Volume 22.3
 Photographs; Weather Report; The Writer, Webber The Contemporary West, Fall 2008, Volume 25.1

Books
  Dismantlements of Silence: Poems Selected and New
 The Dark Hours, which won the Calliope Press Chapbook Prize
 Winter Light
 
 Landscape and Journey
 The Bones Poems

Criticism
 
 
 
. George Whitefield's Journals, 1737–1741, Scholar's Facsimiles & Reprints,1969. Editor
. Understanding Robert Bly, University of South Carolina Press, 1988.
. Robert Bly: The Poet and His Critics, Camden House Publishers, 1994.

Anthologies

References

Living people
American male poets
Baylor University faculty
Year of birth missing (living people)